Vanity Fair is a  BBC television drama serial adaptation of William Makepeace Thackeray's 1848 novel of the same name broadcast in 1967. It was the first drama serial in colour produced by the BBC. Vanity Fair starred Susan Hampshire as Becky Sharp. The serial was also broadcast in 1972 in the US on PBS television as part of Masterpiece Theatre, and Hampshire received an Emmy Award for her portrayal in 1973.

This was the second of four television adaptations of Vanity Fair produced by the BBC; other serials had been transmitted in 1956/57, in 1987, and in 1998.

Plot summary
For a full length summary of the book, see: Vanity Fair plot summary.

Episodes

Cast
 Susan Hampshire as Becky Sharp
 Dyson Lovell as Rawdon Crawley
 Bryan Marshall as Captain Dobbin
 Marilyn Taylerson as Amelia Osborne
 Roy Marsden as George Osborne
 John Moffatt as Jos Sedley
 Barbara Couper as Miss Matilda Crawley
 Barbara Leake as Mrs. Sedley
 Michael Rothwell as Pitt Crawley
 Deddie Davies as Lady Crawley
 Howard Taylor as Horrocks
 John Welsh as Sir Pitt Crawley
 Mark Allington as Ensign Stubble
 Thelma Barlow as Miss Briggs
 Richard Caldicot as Mr. Osborne
 Robert Flemyng as Lord Steyne

Awards
1973: Emmy Award - Outstanding Continued Performance by an Actress in a Leading Role (Drama/Comedy - Limited Episodes) - Susan Hampshire.

DVD
This adaptation is now available on DVD, distributed by Acorn Media UK.

References

External links
Review
 

1960s British drama television series
BBC television dramas
Television shows based on British novels
English-language television shows
Films based on Vanity Fair (novel)